Uppalapati is an Indian surname and may refer to:

 Prabhas (born as Uppalapati Venkata Satyanarayana Prabhas Raju, 1979), Indian actor
 Uppalapati Surya Narayana Raju (died 2010), Telugu producer
 Krishnam Raju (born as Uppalapati Venkata Krishnam Raju, 1940), Indian actor and politician
 Uppalapati Narayana Rao (born 1958), Indian director, screenwriter, scriptwriter, actor and producer